The Maldives National Party (MNP), is a political party in Maldives with a total membership of 10,000 as of 24 November 2021.

A split from the Jumhooree Party, the MNP was invited by the ruling Maldivian Democratic Party in October 2021 to join them in government.

The Maldives National Party declared itself an opposition party to the ruling MDP coalition and has announced that they will be contesting in the 2023 Maldivian presidential election.

History 
On 26 December 2021 MNP presented its member Abdul Hannan Idrees with the primary ticket to contest for the vacant Komandoo constituency by-election.

References

Islamic political parties in the Maldives
Political parties established in 2021
2021 establishments in the Maldives